José Díaz Payán (born 17 December 1916 – 9 August 1990), better known Pepillo, was a Spanish footballer who played as a forward. He was best known for his stint with Sevilla in the 1940s.

Playing career
Pepillo spent most of his playing career with his local Sevilla. He was part of a renowned offensive line at Sevilla called the "Stuka", alongside Raimundo Blanco, José López, Campanal I, and Rafael Berrocal.

References

External links

1916 births
1990 deaths
Footballers from Seville
Spanish  footballers
Association football forwards
Sevilla FC players
Gimnástica de Torrelavega footballers
La Liga players
Segunda División players